bolexbrothers (alternatively Bolex Brothers) was an independent British animation studio founded by Dave Borthwick and Dave Alex Riddett in Bristol, UK. The studio specialised in stop motion and pixilation animation, producing numerous short films and commercials, as well as two feature films, The Secret Adventures of Tom Thumb (1993) and The Magic Roundabout (2005). The studio was named after the Bolex brand of 16mm cameras once popular with animators and was first established as a collective of artists in the 1980s before becoming a company in 1991 and running to roughly 2008.

The studio's films were often dark and surrealistic, described by Borthwick as presenting “a reality that's just slightly sideways”. Their films often employed experimental or uncommon animation techniques such as pixilation (posing and shooting live actors frame-by-frame).

Filmography
Feature films
The Secret Adventures of Tom Thumb (1993) Dir. Dave Borthwick
The Magic Roundabout (2005) Dir. Dave Borthwick
Grass Roots (Unfinished) Dir. Dave Borthwick

Short films
The Biz (1994) Dir. Darren Walsh
The Saint Inspector (1996) Dir. Mike Booth
Keep in a Dry Place and Away From Children (1997) Dir. Martin Rhys Davies
Little Dark Poet (1999) Dir. Mike Booth
Tastes Like Tuna (2000) Dir. Mike Booth
How Do You Feel (2001) Dir. Paul B Davies
The Day of the Subgenius (2001) Dir. Chris Hopewell

Commercials
Nestea - Closed (2000)
Lender's Bagels - Aroma (1999)
Budweiser - Pick Me Up (1999)
Chupa Chups - The Jungle (1998)
Chupa Chups - Barcode (1998)
Nestea - Kwikimart (1998)
Scotland Against Drugs - Animates (1998)
Lego - Canteen (1997)
Carlsberg - Snowman (1997)
Fanta - The Colour of Friendship (1994)
Fanta - Big and Orange (1994)

Music videos
Lost at Sea - Startled Insects
Igors Horn - Startled Insects
Grass Grow - 
Creatures - Startled Insects
Vikings Go Pumping - Loggerheads

References

References

External links
Official website

British animation studios
Film production companies of the United Kingdom